Adalbert Gurath Sr. (7 July 1915 – October 1990) was a Romanian fencer. He competed in the individual sabre event at the 1952 Summer Olympics. His son Adalbert Gurath Jr. also represented Romania in fencing at the Olympics.

References

1915 births
1990 deaths
Sportspeople from Cluj-Napoca
Romanian male fencers
Romanian sabre fencers
Olympic fencers of Romania
Fencers at the 1952 Summer Olympics